Minoboron may refer to:
 Ministry of Defense (Soviet Union) (Министерство обороны СССР)
 Ministry of Defence (Russia) (Минобороны России)